Gierczak is a surname of Polish origin. Notable people with the surname include:

 Emilia Gierczak (1925–1945), Polish soldier
 Piotr Gierczak (born 1976), Polish footballer 

Polish-language surnames
Surnames of Polish origin